Seaán Ó Connmhaigh was Abbot of Corcomroe and Bishop of Clonfert and Bishop of Kilmacduagh during 1419–1441.

Bishop Ó Connmhaigh was one of at least two bearers of the surname (now rendered as Conway to hold this office. He was preceded by an Énri Ó Connmhaigh (fl. 1405). An apparent kinsman, Máel Muire Ó Connaig,  may have been a relative who bore an earlier version of the surname.

His immediate predecessor, Nicol Ó Duibhghiolla, had been appointed before October 1419 but never consecrated.

Ó Connmhaigh was appointed 23 October 1419; he had previously been abbot of the Cistercian Abbey of Corcomroe in the Burren. He died before May 1441. His successor, Dionysius Ó Donnchadha (died before December 1478), was an apparent relative of a previous bishop, Diamaid Ó Donnchadha (appointed about July 1418).

References

Sources
 The Surnames of Ireland, Edward MacLysaght, 1978.
 A New History of Ireland: Volume IX – Maps, Genealogies, Lists, ed. T.W. Moody, F.X. Martin, F.J. Byrne, pp. 322–324.

External links
 http://www.ucc.ie/celt/published/T100005C/
 http://www.irishtimes.com/ancestor/surname/index.cfm?fuseaction=Go.&UserID=

People from County Galway
Medieval Gaels from Ireland
15th-century Roman Catholic bishops in Ireland